The following Union Army units and commanders fought in the Battle of Dallas on May 28, 1864 during the American Civil War.

Abbreviations used

Military Rank
 MG = Major General
 BG = Brigadier General
 Col = Colonel
 Maj = Major
 Cpt = Captain

Other
 w = wounded
 k = killed

Military Division of the Mississippi

MG William T. Sherman

Army of the Tennessee

MG James B. McPherson

XV Corps

MG John A. Logan

XVI Corps

MG Grenville M. Dodge

Cavalry Corps

References
 Civil War Trust
 Eicher, John H., and Eicher, David J., Civil War High Commands, Stanford University Press, 2001, .

American Civil War orders of battle
Atlanta campaign